Lithuania competed at the 2022 European Athletics Championships in Munich, Germany, between 15 and 21 August 2022.

Medalists

Results

A delegation of 19 athletes was sent to represent the country.

Men's events 
Track and road events

Field events

Women's events 
Track and road events

Field events

References

European Athletics Championships
2022
Nations at the 2022 European Athletics Championships